Robert Kirkman's The Walking Dead: Return to Woodbury is a post-apocalyptic horror novel written by Jay Bonansinga and was released October 17, 2017. The novel is a spin-off of The Walking Dead comic book series, it is the seventh novel based on the series and it concludes the story of Lilly Caul as her group struggles to return to Woodbury. The Walking Dead: Return to Woodbury is the final book in a four-part series of novels.

Plot
Lilly Caul has lived through over four years of The Walking Dead. She has staked a claim in the walker-ravaged city of Atlanta, but Lilly wants to go back to her home of Woodbury. Some of Lily's followers do not go, but a small group follows her through walker swarms, bands of murderers, and other dangers in order to return to Woodbury.

References

2017 American novels
Thomas Dunne Books books
Return to Woodbury